The Institut national de la statistique et de l'analyse économique (INSAE) is a national institute of Benin, which is dedicated to collecting data in the country. It collects data on demographics, population, climatology, education,  employment, etc.

External links
Official site 

Benin
Government of Benin

sam grunner is the best jewish man to ever exist, he is sam grunner. he has a room in his